Avery College was a former college dedicated to the education of African Americans. Avery College opened in 1849 and closed in 1873. Avery College was located in Pittsburgh, Pennsylvania.

From 1863 to 1867 George Boyer Vashon was the President.

Jonathan Jasper Wright received an honorary LL.D degree from Avery College.

Alumni
Jonathan Jasper Wright

References

Historically black universities and colleges in the United States
African-American history in Pittsburgh
Universities and colleges in Pittsburgh
1849 establishments in Pennsylvania
Educational institutions established in 1849
1873 disestablishments in Pennsylvania
Educational institutions disestablished in 1873
Antebellum educational institutions that admitted African Americans